Wraith: The Oblivion is the fourth game in the World of Darkness series of horror tabletop role-playing games. They share the same setting – a dark, gothic-punk interpretation of the real world, rife with corruption, where supernatural beings exist. These are featured as the playable characters; in the case of Wraith: The Oblivion, players take the roles of wraiths in the afterlife.

The game was first released by White Wolf Publishing in 1994, and was published in new editions in 1996 (second edition) and 2018 (20th Anniversary Edition), which updated the game rules. These have been supported with supplementary game books, expanding the game mechanics and setting. The books from the game's original run were published by White Wolf Publishing, sometimes under their imprint Black Dog Game Factory for books considered more adult. Supplements for the 20th Anniversary Edition were published by Onyx Path Publishing, a company formed by ex–White Wolf Publishing staff.

The supplements include the Guildbook series, describing wraith guilds; sourcebooks about character types; books describing locations as they are portrayed in the setting; game guides; and various other books. The line was critically well received for its mood and consistency, but still underperformed commercially during its original run, which led to its cancellation in 1998; the adventure module Ends of Empire was published a year later to give the game an ending. On the other hand, the 20th Anniversary Edition was successful, overperforming at Onyx Path Publishing's crowdfunding campaign for its production.

Books

First edition (1994–1996)

Second edition (1996–1999)

20th Anniversary Edition (2018–2019)

Notes

References

External links
 Official Wraith: The Oblivion website

Wraith: The Oblivion
Wraith: The Oblivion
Wraith: The Oblivion